All-Star Videoke is a Philippine television  game show broadcast by GMA Network. The show is a revival of the 2002 karaoke game show All-Star K!. Hosted by Betong Sumaya and Solenn Heussaff, it premiered on September 3, 2017 on the network's Sunday Grande sa Gabi line up replacing Hay, Bahay!. The show concluded on March 25, 2018 with a total of 28 episodes. It was replaced by Lip Sync Battle Philippines in its timeslot.

Gameplay

Laglagan round
The game is played in karaoke style wherein six players take turns singing lines from a pre-selected song in six categories. A computer randomly selects a 6 categories from the game or the called "Videoke Select" and the computer will select or called as "Padyak Select" a player who will sing first then the host will ask the first player if he or she ready to play the song after which the host also ask if the other players will ready to play then the song is started to play as the host sing the first part of the song. The songs will be played with missing words and the players must fill in the blanks correctly in order to ensure staying in the game. Each correct answer equals a certain cash prize in the bangko-oke and as the group of players sing correctly, the pot gets bigger. If the player fails to give the correct lyrics, he or she will fall down the Butas ng Kapalaran after the judges (known as the Laglagers) assessed his or her performance. This cycle continues for five rounds until one player remains.

Double Trouble round 
The Double Trouble round can happen at any time during the five Laglagan rounds. As the number of blanks in the given song are doubled, players will also get the chance to earn double the pot money in the bangko-oke. But, instead of just one player, two players will fall down the Butas ng Kapalaran after the judges' assessment of their performance.

Push & Sing round
In the Push & Sing round, there are songs with missing lyrics from a 3 selected playlist. The Laglagers will sing the song first, and when the host says the word "push", the players will have to press the buzzer as whoever buzzes first must sing the song and answer the blank lyrics. Whoever buzzes first before "push" is said, will lose his or her turn to give chance to another player. A correct answer is equivalent to 1 point. The first player to make 3 points will advance to the jackpot round and will be the All Star Champion of the week. If there is a tie, there will be a sudden death round to break the tie. Whoever loses will fall down the Butas ng Kapalaran.

Jackpot round
In the jackpot round, the defending champion will sing one song with 10 missing lyrics. The first 9 are words while the last is a phrase or line. Each correct answer corresponds to an amount from 10,000 pesos up to 100,000 and will be added to the Banko-oke pot money.

Six studio audience members will also get the chance to participate in this round, who might also fall down the Butas ng Kapalaran, depending on the number of mistakes the defending champion makes.

At the end of the round, the player has a choice whether to defend the title up to 4 consecutive weeks to win more money and the brand new car he or she will select, or, instead to discontinue and take home the pot money. If the player chooses to return the following week, he or she must surrender half of the pot money, and face the last player standing in the Push & Sing round.

On the players 4th week, he or she must sing and fill in all of the blanks correctly, to get the Super-oke prize, which is the brand new car. If not, he or she will still get to take home the total accumulated money in the Banko-oke for the past few weeks.

Hosts

 Betong Sumaya
 Solenn Heussaff

Guest host
 Iya Villania 

Kalye-oke babe
 Arianne Bautista

Episodes 

Color key

Notes

Ratings
According to AGB Nielsen Philippines' Nationwide Urban Television Audience Measurement People in television homes, the pilot episode of All Star Videoke earned an 8.9% rating. While the final episode scored a 7.4% rating. The show got its highest rating on November 5, 2017 with an 11.1%. rating.

References

External links
 
 

2017 Philippine television series debuts
2018 Philippine television series endings
Filipino-language television shows
GMA Network original programming
Karaoke television series
Philippine game shows